Parliamentary elections were held in Poland on 8 September 1935, with Senate elections held a week later on 15 September. They were held under the April Constitution, drawn up earlier in 1935 by the Sanation movement, which had changed the electoral system to one more in its favor. In protest, the opposition boycotted the elections and voter turnout was only 45.9%, the lowest in the history of the Second Republic.

The Nonpartisan Bloc for Cooperation with the Government, the political arm of the Sanation movement, won 181 of the 206 seats in the Sejm and all 96 seats in the Senate.

Results

Sejm

Of the 25 seats won by the Bloc of National Minorities, 19 were taken by the Ukrainian Group, three by the Jewish Group and three by German Minority.

Senate

References

Poland
1935 in Poland
Parliamentary elections in Poland
Election and referendum articles with incomplete results
September 1935 events
1935 elections in Poland